Cinnamon liqueur may refer to one of several brands of alcoholic beverages.

Products
Cinnamon flavored liqueurs include Fireball Cinnamon Whisky, Red Stag Spiced by Jim Beam, DeKuyper's Hot Damn!, Sinfire, Gold Strike and Tennessee Fire by Jack Daniels. Some brands, like Goldschlager and cinnamon Schnapps contain snippets of gold leaf.

Other alcoholic beverages that contain cinnamon include infused vodkas, such as Smirnoff's Cinna-Sugar Twist.  In November 2013, Beam's Pinnacle Vodka and Cinnabon teamed up to introduce their own brand of cinnamon flavored vodka, Cinnabon Vodka.  Yet another is Stolichnaya Zinamom Vodka.

A "sprinkle" of cinnamon and real cream is combined with Virgin Islands rum in Chila 'Orchata Cinnamon Cream Rum.

The first cinnamon flavored Tequila is Peligroso Cinnamon Tequila  made from 100% Blue Agave  launched in March, 2013.  However, a cinnamon cream tequila liqueur expression called Hot Rose  made by McCormick Distilling Company of Missouri with a unique plastic package  antedates Peligroso. A follower is Jose Cuervo's Cinge.

Rakomelo, that is Cinnamon and honey brandy concoctions, called "Cinnamon liqueur" and made with Rakı or Tsipouro, are popular in parts of Greece.

Products that feature cinnamon-infused vodka, include Smirnoff's Cinna-Sugar Twist.  In November 2013, Beam's Pinnacle Vodka and Cinnabon created a joint venture to introduce their own brand of cinnamon flavored vodka, Cinnabon Vodka. Yet another is Stolichnaya Zinamom Vodka.

Recipes for substitutes
For those who desire to make their own "cinnamon liqueur" there is much controversy concerning the proper ingredients.  Particularly, some purported "cinnamon" (that found in "cinnamon sticks") isn't in fact cinnamon. as the latter may be banned or limited in some countries due to the presence of coumarin.

Notes

References

Liqueurs
Cinnamon